Andra-Hus is an Austronesian language spoken on the islands of the same name, off the northern coast of Manus Island, New Guinea.

References

External links 
 Open access archived collections of Robert Blust's materials in Kaipuleohone include recordings (RB1-005) and fieldnotes (RB2-011) on Hus.

Manus languages
Languages of Manus Province